Reign of Light is the sixth album by Swiss industrial metal band Samael, released in October 2004 by Galactical.

Track listing

Personnel

Samael
 Vorph – guitar, vocals, production
 Makro – guitar, production
 Mas – bass, production
 Xy – programming, keyboard, percussion, production

Additional musicians
 Sami Yli-Sirniö – sitar
 Sandra Schleret – vocals

Technical personnel
 Waldemar Sorychta – production
 D-Teck – engineering
 Totor – engineering
 Yves Métry – engineering
 Stefan Glaumann – mixing
 Staffan Celmins – assistant mixing
 Björn Engelman – mastering
 Le Seigneur des Marais – front cover, layout
 Sedrik Nemeth – eyes pictures
 Edi Maurer – band picture

Charts

References

2004 albums
Samael (band) albums
Regain Records albums
Albums produced by Waldemar Sorychta